Haneunim or Hanunim (하느님 "Heavenly Lord"/"Lord of Heaven") is the sky God of Cheondoism and Jeungsanism. In the more Buddhist-aligned parts of these religions, he is identified with Indra. In the more Taoist-aligned parts of these religions, he is also known as Okhwang Sangje (Hangul: 옥황상제 / Hanja: 玉皇上帝, "Highest Deity the Jade Emperor").

Dangun myth

Dangun is traditionally considered to be the grandson of Hwanin, the "Heavenly King", and founder of the Korean nation. Myths similar to that of Dangun are found in Ainu and Siberian cultures.

The myth starts with prince Hwanung ("Heavenly Prince"), son of Hwanin. The prince asked his father to grant him governance over Korea. Hwanin accepted, and Hwanung was sent to Earth bearing three Heavenly Seals and accompanied by three thousand followers. The prince arrived under the Sindansu/ Shindansu (신단수/ Hanja: 神檀樹, "Holy Tree of Sandalwood") on the holy mountain, where he founded his holy city.

At the time of his reign, Ungnyeo or Ungnye (웅녀, 熊女)—who was a bear—and a tiger were living in a cave near the holy city, praying earnestly that their wish to become part of humankind might be fulfilled. Ungnyeo patiently endured weariness and hunger, and after twenty-one days she was transformed into a woman, while the tiger ran away for it could not tolerate the effort. The woman Ungnyeo was overjoyed, and visiting the sandalwood city she prayed that she might become the mother of a child.

Ungnye's wish was fulfilled, so that she became the queen and gave birth to a prince who was given the royal name of Dangun, the "Sandalwood King". Dangun reigned as the first human king of Korea, giving to his kingdom the name of Joseon, "Land of the Morning Calm", in 2333 BC.

According to some scholars, the name Dangun is related to the Turko-Mongol Tengri ("Heaven"), while the bear is a symbol of the Big Dipper (i.e. Ursa Major), itself a symbol of the supreme God in many Eurasian cultures, including Chinese theological thought. Later in the myth, Dangun becomes the Sansin, the "Mountain God" (metaphorically of civilising growth, prosperity).

Kingdom of Hwanin 
In the Hwandan Gogi (환단고기/ Hanja: 桓檀古記), a supposed 20th century compilation of older historical works that is regarded by many to be a forgery, described Gojoseon to have existed and formed in Hwan-guk (환국/  Hanja: 桓國, "Kingdom of Hwan") and Baedal-guk (배달국/ Hanja: 倍達國, "Kingdom of Baedal": later known as Sinsi 신시/ Hanja: 神市, "City of the Gods"). It is said that both nations were ruled by Hwan-in and Hwan-ung, each spanning from 7 rulers and 18 rulers respectively.

Establishment of the Nation 
According to the pseudo-historic document Hwandan Gogi (환단고기/ Hanja: 桓檀古記), Hwan-in transformed himself from the sky of Sabaek-nyeok/ Sabaek-ryeok (사백력,斯白力) to become a god, and with him, 800 young men and women descended from the sky to the eastern land of the shallow sea (천해/ Hanja: 淺海), which is the land of Heuk-su (흑수/ Hanja: 黑水, "Black Water") and Baek-san (백산/ Hanja: 白山, "White Snow-capped Mountain"). Some claims the area of Sabaek-nyeok/ Sabaek-ryeok is Siberia (in spite of the similarity of prior archaic pronunciation), and the shallow sea is Lake Baikal.

The 12 Federations 
According to Hwandan Gogi (환단고기/ Hanja: 桓檀古記), apart the Kingdom of Hwan (환국/ Hanja: 桓國), the nation is a federal state based on a nomadic culture composed each of the 11 countries:

1) Kingdom of Biri (비리국/ Hanja: 卑離國),

2) Kingdom of Yang-un (양운국/ Hanja: 養雲國),

3) Kingdom of Gumak-han (구막한국/ Hanja: 寇莫汗國),

4) Kingdom of Gudacheon (구다천국/ Hanja: 句茶川國),

5) Kingdom of Il-gun (일군국/ Hanja: 一群國),

6) Kingdom of Uru (우루국/ Hanja: 虞婁國) or either the Kingdom of Pilna (필나국/ Hanja: 畢那國),

7) Kingdom of Gaek-hyeon-han (객현한국/ Hanja: 客賢汗國),

8) Kingdom of Gumo-aek (구모액국/ Hanja: 句牟額國),

9) Kingdom of Mae-gu-yeo (매구여국/ Hanja: 賣句餘國) or either the Kingdom of Jikkuda (직구다국/ Hanja: 稷臼多國),

10) Kingdom of Sanapa/ Sanaba (사납아국/ Hanja: 斯納阿國),

11) Kingdom of Seonbi/ Seombi (선비국/ Hanja: 鮮裨國).

Its territory is so vast that it is said to be 50,000 li (around 25,000,000 metres or 25,000 kilometres) from north and south and 20,000 li (10,000,000 metres or 10,000 kilometres) from east and west on record.

Dynasty of Hwanin 
According to Hwandan Gogi (환단고기/ Hanja: 桓檀古記), the Kingdom of Hwan (환국/ Hanja: 桓國), the period lasted for either 3,301 years to 63,182 years during this dynasty of kings, seven in total.

The following rulers of the dynasty is dominantly ancient Korean in nature:

See also
 Chinese theology
 Tian—Shangdi
 Tao
 Three Pure Ones
Counterparts of Haneullim in other Asian cultures
 Amenominakanushi, the Japanese counterpart 
 Jade Emperor, the Chinese counterpart
 Para Brahman, the Hindu counterpart
 Śakra, the Buddhist counterpart
 Tengri, the Turko-Mongolian counterpart
 Thagyamin, the Burmese Buddhist representation of Śakra, a counterpart of the Jade Emperor
 Yahweh or Jehovah (referred as Allah ("the god") in Arabic), the Abrahamic counterpart
 Yuanshi Tianzun, the Taoist counterpart
 Ông Trời, the Vietnamese counterpart

Notes

References

Sources
  Volume I: The Ancient Eurasian World and the Celestial Pivot, Volume II: Representations and Identities of High Powers in Neolithic and Bronze China, Volume III: Terrestrial and Celestial Transformations in Zhou and Early-Imperial China.
 
 
 

God
Religion in Korea
Dangun